Demetrio Paparoni (born Siracusa, Italy, 1954) is an Italian art critic, curator, writer, and editor who has taught History of Modern Art and History of Contemporary Art at the University of Catania.

Art Criticism 
Paparoni is the art critic of the Italian newspaper Domani. He has curated a number of major exhibitions. In 1983 he founded the contemporary art magazine Tema Celeste  and the publishing house of the same name, which he ran until 2000.

His art criticism books include The Devil: A Visual History (Cernunnos/Abrams). and Art and Posthistory, Conversations on the End of Aesthetics written with Arthur Danto (Columbia University Press).

Paparoni has published monographs on Chuck Close, Jonathan Lasker, Timothy Greenfield-Sanders (Alberico Cetti Serbelloni editore), Wang Guangyi, Natee Utarit, Ronald Ventura, Gottfried Helnwein (Skira), Nyoman Masriadi, Rafael Megall, Andres Barrioquinto (Rizzoli New York).

His essays are featured in monographs and catalogs of many artists including Jean-Michel Basquiat, Peter Halley, Keith Haring, Edward Hopper, Zhang Huan, Alex Katz, David La Chapelle, Markus Lupertz, Tony Oursler, Mimmo Paladino, Michelangelo Pistoletto, David Salle, Jenny Saville, Sean Scully, Li Songsong, Doug and Mike Starn, Joana Vasconcelos, and Andy Warhol, among others.

Notes

References 

 Roberta Scorranese (2020). Demetrio Paparoni, Critico d'arte, Il tempo delle donne del Corriere della Sera
 John Sallis (2017). Shades—Of Painting at the Limit, Indiana University Press 
 David Carrier (1994). The Aesthete in the City: The Philosophy and Practice of American Abstract Painting in the 1980s, Pennsylvania State University Press 
 Michael Schmidt (2013). From demonic terrorist to sainted icon: The transfiguration of Nelson Mandela, Daily Maverick
 Paolo Falcone, Valentina Bruschi (2009). Passaggi in Sicilia la collezione di Riso e oltre, Skira 
 Tiziana Andina, Erica Onnis (2019).  The Philosophy and Art of Wang Guangyi, Bloomsbury Publishing 
 Andrea Mecacci (2014). Introduzione a Andy Warhol, Editori Laterza 
 Massimo Melotti (2017). Vicende dell'arte in Italia dal dopoguerra agli anni Duemila, Franco Angeli Edizioni 
 Maria Cristina Carratù (2015). Demetrio Paparoni: "L'estetica non basta, serve l'economia. L'arte sia un concreto motore di rilancio", La Repubblica
 Davide Vecchi (2014). "Expo, al critico d’arte Celant contratto di consulenza da 750mila euro", Il Fatto Quotidiano
  V.v. A.a. (1996). Arte contemporanea italiana pittori e scultori 1946-1996 : opere e mercato 1996-1997, Agnellini 
 V.v. A.a. (1998). Guida ragionata ai periodici italiani, La Rivisteria 
 "Demetrio Paparoni", Samtidskunst.com Contemporary Art
 Av Nora Joung (2018) Vold, sentimentalitet og maktesløshet, Kunstkritikk

Italian art critics
Italian art curators
1954 births
Living people
Academic staff of the University of Catania